Victor Jerome Glover (born April 30, 1976) is a NASA astronaut of the class of 2013 and Pilot  on the first operational flight of the SpaceX Crew Dragon to the International Space Station. Glover is a captain in the U.S. Navy where he pilots an F/A-18, and is a graduate of the U.S. Air Force Test Pilot School. He was a crew member of Expedition 64, and served as a station systems flight engineer.

Personal life 

Glover grew up in Pomona, California, and graduated from Ontario High School in 1994, where he was a quarterback and running back for the Jaguars, and was a recipient of the 1994 Athlete of the Year Award. He attended California Polytechnic State University in San Luis Obispo, California, and received a Bachelor of Science in General Engineering in 1999. While at Cal Poly, Glover became a member of the Phi Beta Sigma fraternity.

In addition to his undergraduate education, Glover holds a Master of Science in Flight Test Engineering from Air University (United States Air Force), a Master of Science in Systems Engineering from the Naval Postgraduate School, and a Master of Military Operational Art and Science, also from Air University.
Glover also holds a Certificate in Space Systems from the Naval Postgraduate School, and a Certificate in Legislative Studies from Georgetown University.

He is married to Dionna Odom Glover and they have four daughters.

Military career
Glover was commissioned as an Ensign in the United States Navy in 1999. He attended primary flight training at Naval Air Station Pensacola, Florida, earning his aviator wings in 2001. He later trained on the F/A-18C Hornet with VMFAT-101 at MCAS Miramar, California. In 2003, he was assigned to VFA-34, based out of Naval Air Station Oceana, Virginia. With VFA-34, he embarked on the final deployment of the USS John F. Kennedy in support of Operation Iraqi Freedom. In June 2006, Glover was selected to attend the United States Air Force Test Pilot School. Following graduation in June 2007, he was designated a test pilot and began his developmental test tour with VX-31, based out of Naval Air Weapons Station China Lake, California. In 2011, he was assigned to VFA-195 for his department head tour. Stationed at Naval Air Facility Atsugi, Japan, VFA-195 embarked on the USS George Washington in support of maritime operations in the Western Pacific Ocean. At the time of his selection in 2013, Glover was assigned to the personal staff of John McCain as a legislative fellow in Washington, D.C.

During his career, Glover has accumulated 3,000 flight hours in more than 40 aircraft, and has completed over 400 carrier arrested landings and 24 combat missions. Glover's call-sign is "Ike”, a name given to him by one of his first commanding officers, standing for "I Know Everything".

NASA career

Glover was introduced as one of the Astronaut Group 21 team in June 2013, completing training in 2015.

Expedition 64/65
In August 2018 Glover was introduced as one of the Commercial Crew astronauts, assigned to fly on the first operational flight, and the second crewed flight overall, of SpaceX's Crew Dragon. As part of that mission, he will be a crew member on ISS Expeditions 64 and 65 for more than six months. Glover is the first African American ISS Expedition crewmember to live on the ISS, not only visit the ISS for a short stay like on the Space Shuttle as an ISS assembly astronaut. According to The New York Times:
Mr. Glover's achievement is notable for NASA, which has worked to spotlight the "hidden figures" in its history, but has so far sent only 14 Black Americans to space out of a total of more than 300 NASA astronauts. He will not be the first Black astronaut aboard the station. But those who preceded him from NASA were members of space shuttle crews during the station’s construction and only made brief stays on the outpost. 

SpaceX Crew Dragon capsule Resilience launched on November 15, 2020, carrying Glover together with two other NASA astronauts (Michael S. Hopkins and Shannon Walker) as well as Soichi Noguchi of Japan. They arrived at the space station on November 17. During his stay on the ISS, Glover was one of 18 astronauts selected for NASA's Artemis program on December 9, 2020.

Glover's first spacewalk, which lasted for more than six hours on January 27, 2021, was a team effort with Hopkins as they worked to upgrade the Columbus module. On his second spacewalk, also with Hopkins, Glover replaced a broken external camera. On Glover's third spacewalk, he and Kate Rubins began work to upgrade the station power supply with hardware in preparation for installation of new solar arrays. 
 
On February 24, 2021, NASA recorded a video call from Vice President Kamala Harris to Glover, in the space station. According to NASA, "the conversation ranged from the legacy of human spaceflight to observing Earth from the vantage of the space station, Glover’s history-making stay aboard the orbiting laboratory, and preparing for missions from the Moon to Mars."

Gallery

Bibliography

See also
 List of African-American astronauts

References

External links
 NASA Astronaut Bio
 Victor Glover on Twitter
 Video call from Vice President Kamala Harris to Victor Glover in the space station (NASA, February 24, 2021) 

Living people
Air University (United States Air Force) alumni
American astronauts
American aviators
California Polytechnic State University alumni
Naval Postgraduate School alumni
People from Pomona, California
People from Prosper, Texas
U.S. Air Force Test Pilot School alumni
1976 births
SpaceX astronauts
Spacewalkers